Zhengzhou Sports Center is a metro station of Zhengzhou Metro Line 1. The station was the western terminus of Line 1 before the opening of phase II project of Line 1 in January 2017.

Zhengzhou Sports Center was originally planned to be built in the surrounding area when the station was constructed. The plan was later changed and the sports center was built in the western area of the city instead, but the name of the station was not changed.

Station layout  
The station has 2 floors underground. The B1 floor is for the station concourse and the B2 floor is for the platforms and tracks. The station has one island platform and two tracks for Line 1.

Some trains use Platform 1 as the terminus during rush hours in weekdays.

Exits

Surroundings
 Zhongyuan Tennis Center (中原网球中心)
 The People's Procuratorate of Zhengzhou (郑州市人民检察院)
 Henan University of Traditional Chinese Medicine (河南中医药大学)

References 

Stations of Zhengzhou Metro
Line 1, Zhengzhou Metro
Railway stations in China opened in 2013